Aethes tornella is a species of moth of the family Tortricidae. It was described by Walsingham in 1898. It is found on Corsica, Sardinia and Sicily and in the Netherlands, Belgium, Germany, on the Iberian Peninsula, in Italy, Austria, Bulgaria, Romania, North Macedonia, the eastern Palearctic realm, and Asia Minor.

Adults are on wing from May to July.

References

tornella
Moths described in 1898
Moths of Europe
Moths of Asia